Come and Get It is the second solo studio album by English singer Rachel Stevens, released on 17 October 2005 by 19 Recordings and Polydor Records. It spawned three singles, two of which reached the top 10, while the album itself reached number 28 on the UK Albums Chart. The album received almost universally positive reviews; two years after the album's release, The Guardian placed it on their "1000 Albums You Must Hear Before You Die" list.

Overview
Three singles were released from Come and Get It during 2005; "Negotiate With Love", "So Good" and "I Said Never Again (But Here We Are)" as well as an earlier hit, "Some Girls" being included as a late addition. The first two of these charted in the UK at number 10, with the third at number 12.  With a television advertising campaign, the album was released by Polydor Records on 17 October 2005, two weeks after the album's final single. Track "Nothing Good About This Goodbye" was announced as the next single in early 2006, with a single mix prepared and promo copies made, but these plans were scrapped.

The album was produced by a number of top record producers, including Xenomania, Richard X, Pascal Gabriel and Jewels and Stone. It reached number 28 in the United Kingdom, remaining of the charts for just two weeks. Come and Get It was not released in many territories outside the UK; in the United States, it was released on 26 June 2007 on iTunes.

The final two tracks, "Every Little Thing" and "Dumb Dumb" are listed on the album as 'bonus tracks', but appear on all versions of the album. "It's All About Me" features a sample from "Lullaby" by The Cure. Stevens herself co-wrote one song from the album; "Funny How".

Critical reception
The album received critical acclaim from the music press. Writing for BBC Music, Talia Kraines wrote that it was "Bold, swaggering and accomplished...Quite simply, it's the pop album of the year." Mention was also made of the credibility of the music, stating that had the songs been done by another artist, they would be "lauded by critics". Allmusic made mention of the album's lack of success saying, "This utterly mediocre [chart] performance (in terms of its genre, at least) is astonishing when you consider that the album was masterminded by the finest songwriters and producers in the game...but its failure becomes utterly mind-boggling when you actually listen to the thing." Of the singles the review said they were "tremendous" and summed up the album as "a collection of 13 thoroughly excellent electronic dance-pop songs". Like many of the reviewers, Ben Hogwood of Music OMH said that almost every song on the album could be a single, but also made mention of the obvious low-involvement of Stevens herself in the making of the music.

Other negative comments included that Stevens' vocals were rather lacklustre and emotionless, while David Cheal of The Telegraph said that "its 13 tracks drift by in a haze of nothingness; it is a masterpiece of insubstantiality." Yahoo Music, like a number of others, claimed the album as "one of the best albums of the year". The Guardian, while two years later lauding the album as an ignored classic, at the time said that it "deserves to be a hit. It is packed with brilliant, cutting-edge pop music". In 2007 they said that its lack of success was "the public's loss". Many reviews commented that the album was a big improvement on her debut, including Londonist who added that it was "a brilliant collection of sophisticated dancefloor songs and quite frankly, one of the most stunning albums of the year." As a summing up, the BBC music review concluded: "Come and Get It is quite simply a pop tour-de-force that deserves to sell a billion copies. Please, don't let this end up as a forgotten classic."

Track listing

(*) denotes additional production

Samples
"All About Me" contains a sample from "Lullaby" by The Cure.

Mini-DVD 
All bonus footage appears on the DVD edition of Come and Get It.
"Sweet Dreams My L.A. Ex"
"Funky Dory"
"Some Girls"
"More, More, More"
"Negotiate with Love"
"So Good"
"I Said Never Again (But Here We Are)"

Production credits 
 Pascal Gabriel: "So Good", "I Will Be There"
 Jewels and Stone and Rob Davis: "I Said Never Again (But Here We Are)", "Every Little Thing"
Richard X: "Crazy Boys", "Some Girls"
 Anders Wollbeck and Mattias Lindblom: "Negotiate With Love"
 Fraser T Smith: "All About Me"
 Johnny Douglas: "Secret Garden"
 Xenomania: "Nothing Good About This Goodbye", "Funny How"
 Damian LeGassick: "Je M'apelle"
 Brian Higgins: "Funny How"
 David Eriksen: "Dumb Dumb"
 Hannah Robinson: additional production on "So Good"
 Jeremy Wheatley and Brio Taliaferro: additional production on "Nothing Good About This Goodbye"
 Pete Hoffmann: additional production on "Some Girls"

Personnel
 Guitar – Eivind Aarset, Nick Coler, Shawn Lee and James Nisbet
 Keyboards – David Eriksen, Julian Gingell, Brian Higgins, Eliott James, Damian LeGassick, Tim Powell, Paul Statham, Barry Stone and Anders Wollbeck
 Background vocals – David Eriksen, Priscilla Jones Campbell, Hannah Robinson, Barry Stone and Richard X
 Drum programming – David Eriksen and Paul Statham
 Mixing – Adrian Bushby, Tommy D., Pete Hofmann, Tim Powell, Fraser Smith, Jeremy Wheatley and Anders Wollbeck
 Engineering – Francesco Cameli, David Eriksen, Pete Hofmann and Fraser Smith
 Programming – Dave Clews, Julian Gingel, Eliott James, Tim "Rolf" Larcombe, Damian LeGassick, Tim Powell, Paul Statham, Barry Stone, Brio Taliaferro, Damian Taylor and Anders Wollbeck
 Mastering – Dick Beetham and Richard Dowling
 Art direction/design – Paul West

Charts

Release history

References

19 Recordings albums
2005 albums
Albums produced by Greg Kurstin
Albums produced by Pascal Gabriel
Albums produced by Richard X
Albums produced by Xenomania
Polydor Records albums
Rachel Stevens albums